The Old Tejon Pass (originally Tejon Pass) is a mountain pass in the Tehachapi Mountains linking Southern and Central California.

Geography
The pass is located in Kern County, California,  to the northeast of the current Tejon Pass.

History

Old Trails 
The ancient native trail which utilized what is now known as the Old Tejon Pass was found and explored in 1772 by Spanish explorer Pedro Fages.  The pass was used in 1776 by missionary explorer, padre Francisco Garcés.  In 1806, Lt. Francisco Ruiz named it Tejon Pass while on an expedition into the San Joaquin Valley.  Ruiz also named Tejon Canyon and Tejon Creek, all referencing the dead badger (or tejón) he had found at the canyon mouth.

In early 1827, the first overland American exploratory journey to California, led by Jedediah Smith, used the pass to move northwest from Antelope Valley into San Joaquin Valley, led by Native American guides familiar with the pass.

Rancho El Tejón, a large 1843 Mexican land grant in the Tehachapi Mountains, was headquartered below the pass along Tejon Creek.  Eventually, a road running straight north (from Elizabeth Lake), across westernmost Antelope Valley, and then over this Tejon Pass evolved.  This route to the pass diverted from the El Camino Viejo at Elisabeth Lake, and from 1849 to before 1854 it was the main road connecting the southern part of the state to the trail along the eastern side of the San Joaquin Valley to the goldfields to the north.

New route established
In 1853, the road which used the Old Tejon Pass was surveyed by Robert Stockton Williamson of the U.S. Army for suitability as a rail-bed for the planned transcontinental railroad into California.  It was found wanting. The commander of the expedition particularly found the wagon road over the pass to be "one of the worst" he had ever seen.  He much preferred the Grapevine Canyon route, a much better road further west.  Williamson scouted it and found it would be far more suitable for rail lines and wagons if the bulk of the traffic henceforth went that way.  The name "Tejon" was transferred west to the "Fort Tejon Pass," an integral part of the Stockton – Los Angeles Road, which was established through Grapevine Canyon.  From then on, the old pass was used less and less; and eventually lost its designation on official maps. Afterward, Fort Tejon was abandoned, and the "Fort" was eventually dropped from the pass' name, becoming simply, the Tejon Pass as it is known today.

References

External links
 history-map.com.  See Map and profile of the Tejon Pass: from explorations and surveys made under the direction of the Hon. Jefferson Davis, Secretary of War, by Lieut. R. S. Williamson, Topl. Engrs. assisted by Lieut. J. G. Parke, Topl. Engrs. and Mr. Isaac Williams Smith, Civ. Engr.; 1853.
  raremaps.com; Features a plate from the US Pacific RR Survey: Great Basin from the Summit of Tejon Pass, an 1853 view of the Old Tejon Pass, looking to the northeast in to the San Joaquin Valley.

Tejon Pass, Old
Tejon Pass, Old
Tejon Pass, Old
Tejon Pass, Old
Tejon Pass, Old
History of Kern County, California
History of Southern California
Pre-statehood history of California
Tejon Pass, Old